Cia-Cia, also known as Buton or Butonese, is an Austronesian language spoken principally around the city of Baubau on the southern tip of Buton Island off the southeast coast of Sulawesi in Indonesia.

In 2009, the language gained international media attention as the city of Baubau was teaching children to read and write Cia-Cia in Hangul, the Korean alphabet, and the mayor consulted the Indonesian government on the possibility of making the writing system official.
However, the project encountered difficulties between the city of Baubau, the Hunminjeongeum Society, and the Seoul Metropolitan Government in 2011. The King Sejong Institute which had been established in Baubau in 2011 to teach Hangul to locals, abandoned its offices after a year of operation in 2012. As of 2017 it remains in use in schools and on local signs. In 2020, the first Cia-Cia dictionary was announced. Written in Hangul, it is set to be published in 2023.

Demographics 
As of 2005 there were 80,000 speakers. Speakers also use Wolio, which is closely related to Cia-Cia,  as well as Indonesian, the national language of Indonesia. Wolio is falling into disuse as a written language among the Cia-Cia, as it is written using the Arabic script and Indonesian is now taught in schools with the Latin script.

Geographic distribution 

Cia-Cia is spoken in Southeast Sulawesi, south Buton Island, Binongko Island, and Batu Atas Island.

According to legend, Cia-Cia speakers on Binonko descend from Butonese troops sent by a Butonese Sultan.

Name 
The name of the language comes from the negator  'no'. It is also known as Buton, Butonese, Butung, and in Dutch , names it shares with Wolio, and as South Buton or Southern Butung.

Dialects 
The language situation on the island of Buton is very complicated and not known in great detail.

Dialects include Kaesabu, Sampolawa (Mambulu-Laporo), Wabula (with its subvarieties), and Masiri. The Masiri dialect shows the greatest amount of vocabulary in common with the standard dialect. The dialect Pedalaman has gh—equivalent to r in other dialects—in native vocabulary, but has r in loan words.

Phonology

Consonants

Vowels

Orthography 
Cia-Cia was once written in a Jawi-like script, called Gundhul, based on Arabic with five additional consonant letters but no signs for vowels.

{|class=wikitable
|+ The Cia-Cia Latin alphabet
|-align=center
! Consonants
| g || k || n || d || dh || t || r~gh || l || m || b || v~w || bh || p || s || ’ || ng|| j || c || h
|-align=center
| IPA||  ||  ||  ||  ||  ||  ||  ||  ||  ||  ||  ||  ||  ||  ||  ||  ||  ||  || 
|-align=center
! Vowels
| a || e || o || u || i || rowspan=2 colspan=15|
|-align=center
| IPA||  ||  ||  ||  || 
|}

In 2009, residents of the city of Baubau set about adopting Hangul, the script for the Korean language, as their script for writing Cia-Cia. In January 2020, the publication of the first Cia-Cia dictionary in Hangul was announced. Set to take three years to publish, it is expected to cost .

* ᄙ is not a separate letter. The medial /r/ and /l/ are distinguished by writing a single letter (ㄹ) for /r/ and double (ᄙ) for /l/. Double ㄹ must be written in two syllables. The final /l/ is written with a single letter ㄹ; for the final consonant /r/, the null vowel (ㅡ) is added. Null consonant and vowel letters (으) are added for initial /l/.

An example of the Hangul script followed by Latin alphabet and IPA:

Words 
The numerals 1–10 are:

{| class="wikitable"
|+ Numerals 1–10
! English
| one || two || three || four || five || six || seven || eight || nine || ten
|-
! Romanization
| ,  || ,  ||  ||  ||  ||  ||  || ,  ||  || 
|-
! Hangul
| 디세, 이세 || 루아 || 똘루 || 빠아 || 을리마 || 노오 || 삐쭈 || ᄫᅡᆯ루, 오알루 || 시우아 || 옴뿔루
|}

References

Citations

Sources 
 van den Berg, René. 1991. "Preliminary notes on the Cia-Cia language (South Buton)." In Harry A. Poeze and Pim Schoorl (eds.), Excursies in Celebes: Een bundel bijdragen bij het afscheid van J. Noorduyn als directeur-secretaris van het KITLV, 305-24. Leiden: KITLV.
 Mustafa Abdullah. 1985. Struktur bahasa Cia-Cia. Proyek Penelitian Bahasa dan Sastra Indonesia dan Daerah Sulawesi Selatan, Departemen Pendidikan dan Kebudayaan.
 Ho-Young Lee, Hyosung Hwang, Abidin. 2009. Bahasa Cia-Cia 1. Hunmin jeongeum Society of Korea.

Cho Tae-Young. 2012. Cia-Cia Language: From The Era of Oral To The Era of Writing. Humaniora No.3 Vol 24. https://media.neliti.com/media/publications/11941-ID-cia-cia-language-from-the-era-of-oral-to-the-era-of-writing.pdf

External links 

 Cia-cia: Sampolawa language on Globalrecordings.net
  Interview on the Cia-Cia's adaption of Hangeul

Muna–Buton languages
Languages of Sulawesi
Hangul